The Torneo Internacional PSA Sporta is a squash tournament held in Santa Catarina Pinula, Guatemala in May. It is part of the PSA World Tour.

Past Results

References

External links
SquashSite Torneo Internacional PSA Sporta 2016 page
PSA Torneo Internacional PSA Sporta 2016

PSA World Tour